The Celtel Africa Challenge Season 2 was the second season of telecommunications company Celtel's round-based competition involving universities from Eastern and Southern Africa.
Like the first season, the second season was hosted by John Sibi-Okumu.

Preliminaries

Kenya
With the change from automatic selection for universities, sixteen Kenyan universities were entered into the preliminary elimination round, held in the University of Nairobi on 1 November 2007.
The universities were:

Africa Nazarene University
Catholic University
Daystar University
Egerton University
Jomo Kenyatta University of Agriculture and Technology
Kenya Methodist University
Kenyatta University
Kabarak University
Masinde Muliro University
Maseno University
Moi University
Pan African Christian University
Scott Theological College
Strathmore University
University of Nairobi
United States International University-Kenya
St Paul's University, entered as the alternate university
After the elimination process and seeding, Strathmore were seeded first, Egerton second, Kenyatta University third and Moi University fourth. The seeded universities proceed to the competition, to be held in January 2008.

Uganda
Eleven Ugandan Universities fielded teams to the national competition, held at. These were:

Bugema University
Busoga University
Islamic University in Uganda
Kampala International University
Kampala University
Makerere University
Makerere University Business School
Mbarara University of Science & Technology
Ndejje University
Nkumba University
Uganda Christian University

The eventual winners and representatives of Uganda at the international competition were Makerere University, Mbarara University of Science and Technology, Nkumba University and Uganda Christian University.

Tanzania
Ten Tanzanian universities took part in the national competition to select the country's representatives to the international competition. These were:
 
Ardhi University
University of Arusha
University of Dar es Salaam
Hubert Kairuki Memorial University
Mzumbe University
Open University of Tanzania
Sokoine University of Agriculture
Saint Augustine University of Tanzania
Tumaini University
Zanzibar University

The teams that qualified were the University of Dar es Salaam, Hubert Kairuki Memorial University, Sokoine University of Agriculture and Saint Augustine University of Tanzania.

Malawi and Zambia
The 2008 challenge sees the entry of universities from Malawi and Zambia. The number of teams entered in the international competition remains the same, with the format changing to include two teams from either country.

Malawi
The University of Malawi and Mzuzu University were selected for the two slots available for Malawi.

Zambia
Eight universities competed for the two slots available for Zambian universities. Among them were:
Australian Institute of Business & Technology
Cavendish University in Zambia
Copperbelt University
Copperstone University
Northrise University
University of Zambia
Zambia Adventist University
Zambian Open University

From these, the universities that advanced to the international competition were the University of Zambia and Copperbelt University.

Competition results

Opening Rounds

Quarter-final

Semi-final

Final

External links
Celtel Africa Challenge official site of the Celtel Africa Challenge
 Results table and air dates for Season 2
Celtel official site of the sponsor, Celtel
Richard Reid TV, Producers of CAC

Student quiz television series
Mass media in Africa